The cryptic litter skink (Caledoniscincus cryptos) is a species of lizard in the family Scincidae. It is endemic to New Caledonia.

References

Caledoniscincus
Skinks of New Caledonia
Endemic fauna of New Caledonia
Reptiles described in 1999
Taxa named by Ross Allen Sadlier
Taxa named by Aaron M. Bauer
Taxa named by Donald J. Colgan